Johnny Showalter was a Canadian football quarterback who played for the Saskatchewan Roughriders in 1946. He played college football at the University of Oregon and Gonzaga University. He was from Eugene, Oregon.

References

Year of birth missing
Possibly living people
American football quarterbacks
Canadian football quarterbacks
American players of Canadian football
Oregon Ducks football players
Gonzaga Bulldogs football players
Saskatchewan Roughriders players
Sportspeople from Eugene, Oregon
Players of American football from Oregon